Fox Creek High School is a public college-preparatory charter school within the South Carolina Public Charter School District, located near North Augusta, South Carolina, United States. It serves students in grades 9–12 (with expansion plans to include a middle school) in Aiken and Edgefield counties.

Academics
Fox Creek High School partners with nearby Piedmont Technical College to offer a selection of advanced dual-enrollment courses. Students take college level American and world history, college level English, college level biology, and college level trigonometry and calculus. All dual-enrollment courses are taken on Fox Creek's campus through accredited teachers.

In addition, the school offers multiple Advanced Placement courses.

Red Fox and Silver Fox Academies
Students that complete 4 credits of Career/Technology courses with a 3.0 GPA or better graduate with the Red Fox Academy distinction.

Students that complete 12 credit hours in dual-enrollment courses with a 3.75 GPA or better graduate with the Silver Fox Academy distinction.

Sports
The Fox Creek Predators field 17 varsity teams, and compete in the SCHSL Region 5-AAA.

In 2017, the Fox Creek varsity baseball team defeated Latta High School to clinch the school's first state championship.

References

External links
 School website

Schools in Aiken County, South Carolina
Charter schools in South Carolina
Public high schools in South Carolina
North Augusta, South Carolina